Itasca County (pronounced eye-ta-ska) is located in the State of Minnesota. As of the 2020 census, the population was 45,014. Its county seat is Grand Rapids. The county is named after Lake Itasca, which is in turn a shortened version of the Latin words veritas caput, meaning 'truth' and 'head', a reference to the source of the Mississippi River. Portions of the Bois Forte and Leech Lake Indian reservations are in the county.

History
The boundary of Itasca County was first formed in 1849, upon the creation of the Minnesota Territory. It was originally a much larger county, which covered many of today's northeastern Minnesota counties.  The original Itasca County stretched over Cook, Lake, Saint Louis, Koochiching, eastern Lake of the Woods, eastern Beltrami, Itasca, northern Aitkin, and northern Carlton counties, today in Minnesota.

Itasca County was originally named for Lake Itasca (no longer in the county's present borders), which was determined to be the true source of the Mississippi River. After many disputes over finding the source of the Mississippi River, Henry Schoolcraft set out to find its true source in 1832. Once he came upon its true source, he decided to name this 'Lake Itasca.' The Mississippi River flows from its small beginnings at Lake Itasca, where it can be crossed on foot. It flows past Bemidji, through Itasca County, and continues to the Gulf of Mexico.

Geography
The terrain of Itasca County is hilly, heavily wooded, and studded with lakes and ponds. It generally slopes to the east, with its highest areas on its upper west border, at 1,437' (438m) ASL. It is the third-largest county in Minnesota by land area.

The landscape in Itasca County varies greatly. The low plains, rolling hills, and wetlands occur where there was glacial activity in the past. This area is known greatly for being forested, and has been for centuries. The different forests are made up of trees such as pines, spruces, hardwoods, cedar, and tamarack. The many large forests in the area make forestry and logging major sectors in the economy.

In Itasca County there are many different bodies of water from big lakes, to small creeks, to major rivers. Over 1400 lakes are located within the county. These bodies of water help support many different wildlife species such as different birds and small mammals. Major bodies of water in the county include Lake Winnibigoshish, Pokegama Lake, Deer Lake, the Mississippi River, Bowstring Lake, and the Blandin Paper Mill Reservoir.

Major highways

  U.S. Highway 2
  U.S. Highway 71
  U.S. Highway 169
  Minnesota State Highway 1
  Minnesota State Highway 6
  Minnesota State Highway 38
  Minnesota State Highway 46
  Minnesota State Highway 65
  Minnesota State Highway 286

Adjacent counties

 Koochiching County - north
 Saint Louis County - east
 Aitkin County - south
 Cass County - southwest
 Beltrami County - west

Protected areas

 Big Fork State Forest
 Botany Bog Scientific and Natural Area
 Chippewa National Forest (part)
 George Washington State Forest (part)
 Golden Anniversary State Forest
 Marcell Experimental Forest
 Scenic State Park

Demographics

2000 census
As of the 2000 census, there were 43,992 people, 17,789 households, and 12,381 families in the county. The population density was 16.5/sqmi (6.37/km2). There were 24,528 housing units at an average density of 9.19/sqmi (3.55/km2). The racial makeup of the county was 94.64% White, 0.16% Black or African American, 3.40% Native American, 0.27% Asian, 0.02% Pacific Islander, 0.16% from other races, and 1.34% from two or more races. 0.60% of the population were Hispanic or Latino of any race. 25.6% were of German, 13.8% Norwegian, 7.7% Finnish, 7.2% Swedish, 6.2% Irish, 5.0% United States or American and 5.0% English ancestry.

There were 17,789 households, out of which 29.20% had children under the age of 18 living with them, 58.30% were married couples living together, 7.60% had a female householder with no husband present, and 30.40% were non-families. 26.00% of all households were made up of individuals, and 12.20% had someone living alone who was 65 years of age or older. The average household size was 2.43 and the average family size was 2.91.

The county population contained 24.40% under the age of 18, 7.60% from 18 to 24, 24.40% from 25 to 44, 26.70% from 45 to 64, and 16.80% who were 65 years of age or older. The median age was 41 years. For every 100 females there were 99.70 males. For every 100 females age 18 and over, there were 98.20 males.

The median income for a household in the county was $36,234, and the median income for a family was $44,025. Males had a median income of $37,066 versus $22,327 for females. The per capita income for the county was $17,717. About 7.70% of families and 10.60% of the population were below the poverty line, including 13.60% of those under age 18 and 8.80% of those age 65 or over.

2020 Census

Communities

Cities

 Bigfork
 Bovey
 Calumet
 Cohasset
 Coleraine
 Deer River
 Effie
 Grand Rapids (county seat)
 Keewatin
 La Prairie
 Marble
 Nashwauk
 Squaw Lake
 Taconite
 Warba
 Zemple

Census-designated places
 Ball Club
 Inger

Unincorporated communities

 Alvwood
 Bass Lake
 Bear River
 Bergville
 Blackberry
 Bowstring
 Dora Lake
 Dunbar
 Goodland
 Grattan
 Gunn
 Houpt
 Jessie Lake
 Mack
 Marcell
 Martin
 Max
 Orth
 Pengilly
 Pomroy
 Rosy
 Spring Lake
 Suomi
 Swan River
 Talmoon
 Togo
 Wawina
 Wirt

Townships

 Alvwood Township
 Arbo Township
 Ardenhurst Township
 Balsam Township
 Bearville Township
 Bigfork Township
 Blackberry Township
 Bowstring Township
 Carpenter Township
 Deer River Township
 Feeley Township
 Good Hope Township
 Goodland Township
 Grand Rapids Township
 Grattan Township
 Greenway Township
 Harris Township
 Iron Range Township
 Kinghurst Township
 Lake Jessie Township
 Lawrence Township
 Lone Pine Township
 Marcell Township
 Max Township
 Moose Park Township
 Morse Township
 Nashwauk Township
 Nore Township
 Oteneagen Township
 Pomroy Township
 Sago Township
 Sand Lake Township
 Spang Township
 Splithand Township
 Stokes Township
 Third River Township
 Trout Lake Township
 Wabana Township
 Wawina Township
 Wildwood Township
 Wirt Township

Unorganized territories

 Bowstring Lake
 Deer Lake
 Effie
 Liberty
 Little Sand Lake
 Northeast Itasca

Politics
Itasca County voters tended to vote strongly Democratic for about 80 years following the Great Depression, selecting the Democratic nominee in every election from 1932 through 2012, along with fellow Iron Range counties St. Louis County, Carlton County, and Lake County. However, in 2016, the county swung hard towards Donald Trump, voting Republican for the first time since 1928 and doing so by giving him a healthy majority of 54.1%. In 2020, it voted for Trump once again, giving him an increased vote share of 57.4%, making it the first time the county had voted Republican two elections in a row since 1924 and 1928.

See also
 National Register of Historic Places listings in Itasca County, Minnesota

References

External links
 Itasca County government’s website
 Minnesota Department of Transportation map of Itasca County (southeastern portion, northwestern portion, northeastern portion)

 
Minnesota counties
Minnesota counties on the Mississippi River
1849 establishments in Minnesota Territory
Populated places established in 1849